Charley Boorman (born 23 August 1966) is a British TV presenter, travel writer and actor. A motorbike enthusiast, Boorman has made three long-distance motorcycle rides with his friend Ewan McGregor, documented in Long Way Round (2004), Long Way Down (2007), and Long Way Up (2020).

Early life and background
Born in Wimbledon, London, Boorman spent much of his formative years in County Wicklow, Ireland. Boorman is the son of German costume designer Christel Kruse and film director Sir John Boorman. Lee Marvin, a lifelong friend of his father, was Charley's godfather.

Boorman attended three schools in Ireland: St Gerard's School (Bray, County Wicklow) and St Oliver Plunkett Primary School (Monkstown, County Dublin), both Roman Catholic schools, the latter a school dedicated to teaching children with dyslexia. He also attended the German-language medium school, St Kilians Deutsche Schule (Dublin). In England, he went on to attend Sibford School, a Quaker school near Banbury, Oxfordshire (from 1980 to 1983).

Marriage
He and his wife Olivia have two daughters and live in London.

Acting career
At an early age, Boorman started appearing in films directed by his father. His first role was in Deliverance (1972).

Boorman played a young Mordred in Excalibur (1981) (joined by his older sister Katrine Boorman who played Ygraine, Mordred's grandmother), then in 1985 played a leading role in The Emerald Forest. In 1987 he had a non-speaking role in Hope and Glory as a young German Luftwaffe pilot parachuting into wartime London, having been shot down; his sister Katrine also appeared in that film.

His further acting appearances include The Serpent's Kiss (1997), on which he met Ewan McGregor, and The Bunker (2001).

Theatre show
In 2007, Boorman appeared on stage in Newcastle upon Tyne at the Tyne Theatre. The 'evening with' style show then went on a tour around the UK and Ireland in 2010. Around this time Boorman revealed he had testicular cancer. Caught early, he had a testicle removed and has since been a supporter of Movember. Boorman was given the all-clear, but continued telling audiences across the country about his ordeal, encouraging more men to be aware and get checked out early if there was any concern. In 2011, the Charley Boorman Live show toured the UK and Ireland again, following a similar format to the first tour but without support acts.

Boorman also began promoting African Adventures, which are commercial 17-day BMW motorcycle trips across Africa. Taking 50 riders from Cape Town to Victoria Falls, Boorman used various technologies to help promote the trip, including a GPS satellite tracking device allowing people to follow the trip day by day.

Charity work
Boorman has supported the United Nations Children's Fund (UNICEF) since 2004, carrying out a number of visits to UNICEF projects, which have been noted in his television programmes Long Way Round, Long Way Down and By Any Means. In 2009, Boorman was made president of Dyslexia Action; he is dyslexic. Boorman has been on many visits to Dyslexia Action's regional centres and was involved in the charity's appeal "It's ME!". He also supported its school initiative "P4L" (Partnership for Literacy). Boorman recently participated in a live web chat for the charity where he answered questions about his dyslexia and his various adventures.

In 2009, Boorman went to Helmand Province, Afghanistan and visited troops. Kandahar and Bastion were the two key camps he visited, just before Christmas.

In February 2014 and November 2016 Boorman presented Gold Duke of Edinburgh's Awards  at St James's Palace, on behalf of The Duke of Edinburgh.

Accident
Boorman was involved in a serious accident whilst test riding a motorbike with journalists in Portugal in 2016. Boorman broke both legs after colliding with a wall whilst avoiding a car that pulled out in front of him. He then broke his hip riding a Vespa whilst still in recovery. After a period reliant on a wheelchair, Boorman is back riding, but now walks with a limp as his left leg is 1 cm shorter than his right after operations to repair the breaks.

Presenting career

Long Way Round

In 2004, Ewan McGregor and Boorman undertook an international motorcycle journey from London to New York, riding east across Europe, Asia, and North America. This was recorded for a popular television series and book.

Race to Dakar

Along with producer Russ Malkin (from Long Way Round) and a motorbike team, Boorman competed in the 2006 Dakar Rally in January 2006. The event was filmed and the series Race to Dakar began on Sky2 in the United Kingdom in October 2006. During the rally Boorman injured himself and was forced to retire from the race after five days.

Long Way Down

In 2007, he took another journey with McGregor: Long Way Down, a trip from John o' Groats in Scotland, to Cape Town, South Africa. This was televised on BBC2 starting in October 2007. During this initial programme, it became public knowledge that Boorman's wife was undergoing treatment for pneumonia, but had insisted that he complete the trip.

By Any Means

In 2008, Boorman produced By Any Means, which started in his hometown in County Wicklow, ending in Sydney. He set out to complete the journey "by any means", using local transport appropriate to the area being travelled, and using air travel only when necessary.

Right to the Edge: Sydney to Tokyo By Any Means

In 2009, Boorman undertook a journey titled Right to the Edge: Sydney to Tokyo By Any Means, travelling from Sydney to Tokyo via the Pacific Rim. The programme documenting this trip has been shown on BBC2 in the UK.

World's Most Dangerous Roads: Alaska
Boorman appeared with Sue Perkins in Series 1 of the BBC TV series World's Most Dangerous Roads: Alaska, shown in 2011, in which they drove the Dalton Highway.

Charley Boorman's Extreme Frontiers
In 2011, Boorman presented a prime-time adventure series for Channel 5, Charley Boorman's Extreme Frontiers. This show was another collaboration between Boorman and producer-director Russ Malkin, who made frequent on-screen appearances. Extreme Frontiers claimed to 'take in all four extremities of Canada'. Accompanying the show was book and DVD.

In 2012, Boorman continued the series in a South African setting. From 9 June to 22 July 2012, Boorman and his team journeyed around South Africa on two motorbikes and a 4-wheel vehicle.

Charley Boorman USA Adventure
Boorman and Malkin returned on Channel 5 at the end of 2013 for his next trip, which was in the US. Starting in Hawaii, he moves to Alaska, then to the Eastern seaboard and down to the Southern states, inland to the Gulf of Mexico, up again to the Rockies and finishing on the Pacific Coast at Los Angeles

Long Way Up

Boorman and McGregor traveled in 2019 from the southernmost tip of South America up to Los Angeles, on electric Harley-Davidson LiveWire motorbikes.

Motorbike TV 
In 2022 Boorman began presenting Motorbike TV, a motorcycle magazine entertainment show for Motorsport.TV.

Filmography

Film

Deliverance (1972) - Ed's Boy
Excalibur (1981) - Boy Mordred
Nemo (1984) - Cunegond / lift Operator
The Emerald Forest (1985) - Tomme
Hope and Glory (1987) - Luftwaffe Pilot
Ada dans la jungle (1988) - Nancy
Mister Frost (1990) - Thief
Connemara (1990) - Loup
Massacres (1991) - Ronny
Beyond Rangoon (1995) - Photographer
Two Nudes Bathing (1995, Short) - The Painter
The Serpent's Kiss (1997) - Secretary
Cannes Man (1997) - Himself
Cash in Hand (1998) - George Tompkins
The Bunker (2001) - Pfc. Franke
I, Cesar (2003) - Charley Fitzpatrick
In My Country (2004) - Adam Hartley
Travellers (2011) - Brian Seaborn
David Knight: Iron Man of Enduro (2004) - Himself - Narrator

Bibliography
Long Way Round (2004 – With Ewan McGregor)
Race to Dakar (2006)
Long Way Down (2007 – With Ewan McGregor)
By Any Means (2008)
Right to the Edge: Sydney to Tokyo By Any Means (2009)
Extreme frontiers (2011)
Long Way Back - Autobiography (2017)

References

 Holmstrom, John. The Moving Picture Boy: An International Encyclopaedia from 1895 to 1995. Norwich, Michael Russell, 1996, p. 363.

External links

 WideWorld magazine – Interview with Charley Boorman

Living people
1966 births
English explorers
English male child actors
English male film actors
English people of Dutch descent
English people of German descent
Long-distance motorcycle riders
Male actors from County Wicklow
Motorcycling mass media people
People educated at Sibford School
People educated at St Gerard's School, Bray
People educated at St Kilian's German School
Actors with dyslexia
Television presenters with dyslexia